Sulphur is an unincorporated community within Henry County, Kentucky, United States.

History
Sulphur was a station on the Louisville and Cincinnati Railroad. Formerly called Sulphur Station, the post office was renamed Sulphur in 1882.

Notable people

Joseph W. Morris, U.S. Representative

References

Unincorporated communities in Henry County, Kentucky
Unincorporated communities in Kentucky